Akpondu is a Plateau language of Nigeria once spoken in Akpondu village, Kaduna State. The Akpondu people have shifted to Ninzo. Only the numerals have been recorded. The extinct undocumented languages Nigbo and Babur (Bəbər) were also spoken in nearby villages of Nigbo and Babur, respectively.

Numerals
Akpondu numerals were recalled by the village head of Akpondu in 2005. They are:

References

Languages of Nigeria
Alumic languages
Extinct languages of Africa
Languages extinct in the 21st century